Valentina Kogan (born 19 March 1980) is an Argentine handball goalkeeper. She plays for Vilo and the Argentina national team and participated at the 2011 World Women's Handball Championship in Brazil.

Biography
Valentina Kogan is diabetic since the age of 10, and vegetarian since the age of 15. She started playing handball when she was in middle school at Colegio Tarbut, a Jewish private school with a trilingual education program. Kogan studied International Relations at the University of San Andrés, and is married since 2013 to Carolina Rieger. As of 2016, the couple is expecting twins, conceived by artificial insemination.

Career
Kogan played professionally in Spain between 2002 and 2005 for the Spanish team Vícar Goya Koppert. She is also the director of Club de Corredores, a company dedicated to the organization of marathons and outdoor races.

As the goalkeeper for the National squad, she won silver medals at three Pan American Games (Santo Domingo 2003, Guadalajara 2011 and Toronto 2015) and the bronze medal at the Pan American Women's Handball Championship (Santo Domingo 2007), plus a bronze medal at the 2007 Pan American Games. In 2009, the team won the gold medal of the Pan American Championship after defeating Brazil. She also won the gold medal at the 2010 South American Games held in Medellín, Colombia.

Kogan retired from the Argentina National team after the 2016 Summer Olympics, finishing an 18-years long presence at the international level and inaugural participation of Argentina in Women's Handball at the Olympic Games.

Individual Achievements
Top Goalkeeper:
2015 Pan American Games

References

External links

1980 births
Living people
Argentine Jews
Argentine female handball players
People with diabetes
Lesbian Jews
Argentine LGBT sportspeople
Argentine lesbians
LGBT handball players
Handball players at the 2016 Summer Olympics
Olympic handball players of Argentina
Handball players at the 2003 Pan American Games
Handball players at the 2007 Pan American Games
Handball players at the 2011 Pan American Games
Handball players at the 2015 Pan American Games
Pan American Games medalists in handball
Pan American Games silver medalists for Argentina
Pan American Games bronze medalists for Argentina
Sportspeople from Buenos Aires
South American Games gold medalists for Argentina
South American Games medalists in handball
Competitors at the 2010 South American Games
Medalists at the 2007 Pan American Games
Medalists at the 2015 Pan American Games
Medalists at the 2011 Pan American Games
21st-century Argentine women